Maria Igorevna Galay (born 14 October 1992) is a Russian footballer who plays as a defender and has appeared for the Russia women's national team.

Career
Galay has been capped for the Russia national team, appearing for the team during the 2019 FIFA Women's World Cup qualifying cycle.

International goals

References

External links
 
 
 

1992 births
Living people
Russian women's footballers
Russia women's international footballers
Women's association football defenders
FC Minsk (women) players
Zvezda 2005 Perm players